The 2019–20 season was Nottingham Forest's 154th year in existence and 12th consecutive season in the EFL Championship. In addition to the Championship, the club participated in the FA Cup and the EFL Cup. The season covered the period between 1 July 2019 and 22 July 2020.

First team squad

New contracts

Pre-season
Forest announced a pre-season  schedule of friendlies against Alfreton Town, Dundee, Atromitos, Olympiacos, Crystal Palace and Real Sociedad. The first team were relieved of friendlies arranged against Peterborough United, Mansfield Town and Lincoln City following the appointment of Sabri Lamouchi as head coach on 28 June 2019.

Competitions

Championship

League table

Results summary

Results by matchday

Matches

FA Cup

EFL Cup

Goals and appearances

 
 

|}

Transfers

Transfers in

Loans in

Transfers out

Loans out

Awards

Club

League

Sky Bet Championship Manager of the Month

Sky Bet Championship Player of the Month

PFA Bristol Street Motors Fan's Championship Player of the Month

Cups

References

Nottingham Forest
Nottingham Forest F.C. seasons